Costa de Oro is a  long group of resort towns and beaches in Canelones Department, Uruguay, east of the Ciudad de la Costa. Until 19 October 1994 it also included all the resorts that became henceforth integrated under the name Ciudad de la Costa. Since then, Costa de Oro contains only the resorts and locations of the area delimited by the streams Arroyo Pando to the west and Arroyo Solís Grande to the east and by the highways Ruta 8 and Ruta 9 to the north.

History
Until the beginning of the 20th century, the coast of Canelones was a desert of dunes and marshes. Being unsuitable for agriculture, this land was considered of little value.

By 1870, some of the economically powerful families of Montevideo acquired the custom of setting up summer camps in Santa Rosa Beach (the actual Mansa Beach of Atlántida). They traveled in wagons that were used as housing, and they transported food supplies, including chickens and dairy cows for a three-month stay.

In 1908 efforts began to ameliorate the land of dunes. Pines brought from Galicia, Portugal and southern France were planted, as well as eucalyptus and acacias. From the following decade onwards, various resorts started developing along the coast, with Atlántida the first and the biggest and most developed until the 1990s. 

The rapid growth of the rural area adjacent to the coast in the decade of the 1990s, increasingly linked to tourism, and the expansion of the metropolitan area of Montevideo have significantly changed the area.

Coastal resorts of Costa de Oro

 Neptunia
 Pinamar-Pinepark
 Salinas
 Marindia
 Fortín de Santa Rosa
 Villa Argentina
 Atlántida
 Las Toscas
 Parque del Plata
 Las Vegas
 La Floresta
 Costa Azul
 Bello Horizonte
 Guazuvirá Nuevo
 Guazuvirá
 San Luis
 Los Titanes
 La Tuna
 Araminda
 Santa Lucía del Este
 Biarritz
 Cuchilla Alta
 El Galeón 
 Santa Ana
 Balneario Argentino
 Jaureguiberry

See also
Ciudad de la Costa

References

External links
www.turismo.gub.uy (Spanish) (Note: The stated 70 km of length appears to indicate the older definition of the Costa de Oro.)
Maps of various resorts of Costa de Oro

Populated places in the Canelones Department
Beaches of Uruguay